Stacks, formerly Blockstack, is an open-source platform to enable smart contracts, DeFi, NFTs, and apps for Bitcoin. Stacks blockchain is a "layer" for Bitcoin similar to the Lightning Network. In addition to smart contracts, the Stacks project provides open-source software for authentication, and data storage.

Design 

Concerns around internet privacy, security, and data breaches brought attention to the Stacks project. Software developers have used the Stacks software to build decentralized alternatives to popular services. Stacks (STX) token is the native cryptocurrency of the Stacks blockchain, which is used as gas fee for executing smart contracts and processing transactions.

History 

Stacks project was originally started by Muneeb Ali and Ryan Shea as Blockstack. STX became the first SEC qualified token offering in 2019. Blockstack PBC, a company working on the Stacks technology, raised around $75 million through a mix of venture capital and token sales. The main Stacks blockchain launched in Jan 2021.

Applications

Blockchain Naming System (BNS) 
The Blockchain Naming System is an application used to register human-readable, globally unique names with accounts on the Stacks blockchain. A BNS name consists of a namespace, the name and optionally a subdomain. Examples are muneeb.id, muneeb.btc and muneeb.id.blockstack.

CityCoins
The CityCoins project has launched fungible tokens for the cities of Miami and New York City. In September 2021, Miami's city commissioners voted to accept the protocol treasury, valued at $21 million at the time. MiamiCoin's value crashed, and so Stacks donated $5.25M to the City of Miami.

References 

Blockchains
Computing platforms
Cryptocurrencies